Hypatopa texanella is a moth in the family Blastobasidae. It is found in the United States, including Texas, Arizona and Utah.

The wingspan is 14–16 mm. The forewings are hoary whitish cinereous (ash gray), shaded and speckled with brownish gray. The hindwings are pale yellowish brown with a shining gloss.

References

Moths described in 1907
Hypatopa